Troy Michael Snitker (born December 5, 1988) is an American professional baseball coach for the Houston Astros of Major League Baseball (MLB).

Career
Snitker attended Brookwood High School and played college baseball for South Georgia State College and North Georgia College and State University. The Atlanta Braves selected Snitker in the 19th round of the 2011 MLB draft. He played in Minor League Baseball for the Braves organization until they traded him to the Pittsburgh Pirates in 2013. That year, he played for the Southern Maryland Blue Crabs of the Atlantic League of Professional Baseball, an independent baseball league. Snitker retired prior to the start of the 2014 season, due to a concussion.

After he retired as a player, Snitker became a coach for North Georgia before joining the Houston Astros organization. He served as the hitting coach for the Corpus Christi Hooks in 2018. After the 2018 season, the Astros named him to their major league coaching staff as a hitting coach alongside Alex Cintrón.  In 2022, the Astros won 106 games, the second-highest total in franchise history.  They advanced to the World Series and defeated the Philadelphia Phillies in six games to give Snitker his first career World Series title.

Personal life
He is the son of Brian Snitker, the manager of the Atlanta Braves. The Houston Astros faced the Atlanta Braves in the 2021 World Series, which made the series a family affair for the Snitkers. Snitker and his father, for the Astros and Braves respectively, presented the batting lineup cards before Game Three of the World Series.

References

External links

1988 births
Living people
Baseball catchers
Baseball coaches from Georgia (U.S. state)
Baseball players from Atlanta
Danville Braves players
Gulf Coast Braves players
Houston Astros coaches
Lynchburg Hillcats players
Major League Baseball hitting coaches
Minor league baseball coaches
Minor league baseball players
North Georgia Nighthawks baseball players
Rome Braves players
Southern Maryland Blue Crabs players
South Georgia Tigers baseball players